The Classification of Territorial Units for Statistics (NUTS, for the French ) is a geocode standard for referencing the administrative divisions of countries for statistical purposes. The standard was developed by the European Union.

There are three levels of NUTS defined, with two levels of local administrative units (LAUs). Depending on their size, not all countries have every level of division. One of the most extreme cases is Luxembourg, which has only LAUs; the three NUTS divisions each correspond to the entire country itself.

There are 92 first-level NUTS regions of the European Union, and 240 second-level NUTS regions.

Former member states 
Below are the first-level NUTS regions of former member states of the European Union.

EFTA member states
Below are the first-level NUTS regions of EFTA.

EU candidates
Below are the first-level NUTS regions of candidates of the European Union.

See also 
 Local government 
 Regional policy of the European Union
 Region (Europe)

External links 
 Europa – Eurostat – Regions
 Overview maps of the NUTS and Statistical Regions of Europe – Overview map of EU Countries – NUTS level 1 [Archive]
 The 104 NUTS-1 EU Regions of 2016 to present

 1
 
Types of geographical division